The Way to Go Out is a 1985 live album by Australian rock band Hunters & Collectors, which was first released on 6 May 1985. It was recorded at Earl's Court in the Melbourne suburb of St Kilda in two days on 24 and 25 August 1984, and reached No. 76 on the Australian Kent Music Report Albums Chart and No. 21 on the New Zealand Albums Chart. Six of the eight tracks were from their 1984 album The Jaws of Life, and "Throw Your Arms Around Me" had been released as a non-album single. "Follow Me No More" had not been released in Australia but had been part of the UK-only single "Carry Me" in 1984. Under the shortened title "Follow Me" it would become the B-side to their "Say Goodbye" single a year after The Way to Go Out was released.

Track listing

Certifications

References

External links
 Hunters & Collectors – The Way To Go Out at Discogs website

Way to Go Out
Way to Go Out
Way to Go Out
Mushroom Records live albums